Robert Bürchler (28 May 1915 – 23 April 1993) was a Swiss sport shooter. He won a silver medal in Men's 300 m Rifle, 3 positions at the 1952 Summer Olympics in Helsinki, behind Anatoli Ivanovich Bogdanov and ahead of Lev Vainshtein.

References

1915 births
1993 deaths
Swiss male sport shooters
Shooters at the 1952 Summer Olympics
Olympic shooters of Switzerland
Olympic silver medalists for Switzerland
Olympic medalists in shooting
Medalists at the 1952 Summer Olympics